Infernal Bridegroom Productions (IBP) was a theater company located in Houston, Texas, formed in 1993 and dissolved in 2007. IBP garnered national attention when it was featured on the cover of American Theatre in September, 2002, for its original play, We Have Some Planes, by Brian Jucha, about the events of September 11. The theater's name is taken from a line in one of its first productions, In the Jungle of Cities by Bertolt Brecht.  The line reads, "In my dreams I call him my infernal bridegroom."  IBP produced over 60 plays, many of them world premieres.

About the company
The Houston Theater District is the second largest in the United States, after New York, New York, boasting theaters of all sizes, from the LORT Alley Theatre, to midsize theaters such as Stages Repertory Theatre and Main Street Theater, and small nomadic theaters such as Mildred's Umbrella.

Infernal Bridegroom Productions ceased operations in July 2007 due to insurmountable financial difficulties.

Founded in 1993 by Jason Nodler and Jim Parsons, IBP produced 68 plays and was recognized locally and nationally for its provocative new work, its talented ensemble and its success in attracting non-traditional audiences.  Nodler was artistic director until 2003 when he left to travel the country.  Associate artistic director Anthony Barilla became artistic director until moving out of the country in 2007.  Nodler returned to Houston to found The Catastrophic Theatre with Tamarie Cooper later in that year.

The company's 2006 world premiere rock opera Speeding Motorcycle, created in collaboration with acclaimed artist and songwriter Daniel Johnston, received favorable coverage in The New York Times, Art in America, No Depression magazine, the Austin Chronicle and local media outlets. Past works also received positive coverage from American Theatre, Theatre Journal, Stage Directions and the Dallas Morning News.

IBP appeared regularly in the annual Houston Press "Best of Houston" issue, receiving awards for Best Theater Company, New Play, Original Show, Director, Actor, Actress, Set Design, Light Design, Costume Design, Special Effects, Christmas Show and Rock and Roll Theater. And the Houston Chronicle called IBP Houston's best experimental theater.

IBP enjoyed a large and loyal audience as well as regularly attracting out-of-towners that travelled to Houston specifically to see the company's work.

The company was acclaimed for its productions of rarely produced plays by Samuel Beckett, Eugène Ionesco, Bertolt Brecht, Georg Büchner, Jean Genet, Anton Chekhov, Sam Shepard and David Mamet and was the first to introduce Houston audiences to the works of playwrights Suzan-Lori Parks, Maria Irene Fornes, Sarah Kane, Heiner Müller, Wallace Shawn, Charles Mee, Richard Foreman, Mac Wellman and Bernard-Marie Koltès. IBP also attracted national attention for the theatrical premiere of A Soap Opera by Ray Davies and The Kinks and was lauded for its hit production of Broadway musical Guys and Dolls.

But IBP was perhaps best known for the new work it created. Highlights included Fucking A, commissioned by IBP and DiverseWorks Artspace and written and directed by Pulitzer Prize winner Suzan-Lori Parks; We Have Some Planes and Last Rites, conceived and directed by renowned theater artist Brian Jucha; Hide Town, commissioned by the NEA and TCG and written by Lisa D'Amour; Speeding Motorcycle, commissioned by the Rockefeller Foundation and conceived and directed by IBP founding artistic director Jason Nodler in collaboration with Daniel Johnston and the IBP company; Nodler's original plays In the Under Thunderloo, King Ubu is King and Meatbar; company member Troy Schulze's Me-sci-ah, Jerry's World (adapted from the radio shows of cult figure Joe Frank) and Actual Air (adapted from the poetry and music of Silver Jews frontman David Berman); founding company member Tamarie Cooper's 20 Love Songs and the wildly popular Tamalalia series created and directed by Cooper.

Although IBP was in residence at the legendary punk club The Axiom for five years, it spent nine years as a homeless company, performing in warehouses, bars, restaurants, aboard a moving school bus, in an abandoned outdoor shopping center and occasionally in traditional theater spaces such as Stages Repertory Theatre and DiverseWorks.

Music composed and recorded by IBP's resident orchestra, under the direction of former artistic director Anthony Barilla, has enjoyed regular radio play on college stations around the country and on NPR's This American Life. The orchestra also recorded original music for IBP.

Plays performed

1993
  In the Under Thunderloo (World Premiere) by Jason Nodler

1994
  In the Jungle of Cities by Bertolt Brecht
  Rhinoceros by Eugène Ionesco

1995
  The Balcony by Jean Genet
  Endgame by Samuel Beckett
  Marat/Sade by Peter Weiss
  MUD by Maria Irene Fornes

1996
  Othello by William Shakespeare
  Suicide in B Flat by Sam Shepard
  Samuel's Major Problems by Richard Foreman  
  Woyzeck by George Büchner
  Guys and Dolls by Frank Loesser / Abe Burrows
  Eddie Goes to Poetry City by Richard Foreman
  The Future is in Eggs by Eugène Ionesco

1997
  The Cherry Orchard by Anton Chekhov
  Waiting for Godot by Samuel Beckett
 Tamalalia 2! (World Premiere) by Tamarie Cooper
 Quartet by Heiner Müller
 Cowboy Mouth by Sam Shepard and Patti Smith
 Camino Real by Tennessee Williams
 Last Rites (World Premiere) by Brian Jucha

1998
 Threepenny Opera by Bertolt Brecht / Kurt Weill
 In The Jungle of Cities by Bertolt Brecht
 Tamalalia 3: The Cocktail Party (World Premiere) by Tamarie Cooper
 Harm's Way by Mac Wellman
 King Ubu is King (World Premiere) by Jason Nodler

1999
 Marie and Bruce by Wallace Shawn
 Tamalalia 4: The Campout (World Premiere) by Tamarie Cooper
 Roberto Zucco by Bernard-Marie Koltès
 Edmond by David Mamet

2000
 Fucking A (World Premiere) by Suzan-Lori Parks
 Tamalalia 2000: The Time Machine (World Premiere) by Tamarie Cooper
 The Danube by Maria Irene Fornes
 Happy Days by Samuel Beckett

2001
 Action and Chicago by Sam Shepard
 Tamalalia 6 (World Premiere) by Tamarie Cooper
 MUD by Maria Irene Fornes

2002
 In the Under Thunderloo by Jason Nodler
 We Have Some Planes (World Premiere) by Brian Jucha
 Tamalalia 7: The Love Show (World Premiere) by Tamarie Cooper
 Phaedra's Love by Sarah Kane
 A Soap Opera by The Kinks

2003
 Actual Air (world premiere) adapted from the poetry of David Berman by Troy Schulze
 The Noblest of Drugs (World Premiere) by Joel Orr
 Meat/BAR (World Premiere) by Jason Nodler
 Tamalalia 8 (World Premiere) by Tamarie Cooper
 Jerry's World (World Premiere) adapted from the radio programs of Joe Frank by Troy Schulze
 Rhinoceros by Eugène Ionesco

2004
 Symphony of Rats by Richard Foreman
 The Hotel Play by Wallace Shawn
 Tamalalia 9 (World Premiere) by Tamarie Cooper
 Trappakeepa & Girth And Topical by Lindsay Kayser: a co-production with Gypsy Baby Theater
 Me-sci-ah (World Premiere) by Troy Schulze
 BAAL by Bertolt Brecht

2005
 Me-sci-ah (The Second Coming) by Troy Schulze
 Medea by Euripides, adapted by Charlie Scott
 Night Just Before the Forests by Bernard-Marie Koltès
 Tamalalia X: The Greatest Hits Show (World Premiere) by Tamarie Cooper
 What You've Done by Aaron Landsman: a co-production with DiverseWorks Artspace and Project Row Houses
 Full Circle by Charles L. Mee

2006
 Uncle Vanya by Anton Chekhov
 Speeding Motorcycle by Daniel Johnston, adapted & directed by Jason Nodler
 Microscope Maintenance & Repair by Lindsay Kayser
 Speeding Motorcycle by Daniel Johnston, adapted & directed by Jason Nodler (encore)
 Hide Town by Lisa D'Amour

2007
 365 Days/365 Plays by Suzan Lori-Parks
 20 Love Songs (World Premier) by Tamarie Cooper

Awards

2000
  Houston Press:  Best Designer:  Devlin Browning, for Edmond
  Houston Press:  Best Director:  Jason Nodler for Edmond
  Houston Press:  Best Christmas Show:  Edmond

2001
  Houston Press:  Best Designer:  Steven K. Barnett for The Danube

2002
  Houston Press:  Best Director:  Brian Jucha for We Have Some Planes
  Houston Press:  Best Actress (Readers' Choice):  Tamarie Cooper
  Houston Press:  Best Actor (Readers' Choice):  Troy Schulze
  Houston Press:  Best Original Show:  We Have Some Planes

2003
  Houston Press:  Best Rock and Roll Theater:  A Soap Opera

2004
  Houston Chronicle:  Best Experimental Theater
  Houston Press:  Best Set Design:  Symphony of Rats
  Houston Press:  Best Original Show:  Jerry's World

2005
  Houston Chronicle:  Best Rebel with a Cause:  Troy Schulze
  Houston Press:  Best Original Show:  Tamalalia X:  The Greatest Hist Show
  Houston Press:  Best Performance Space:  The Axiom
  Houston Press:  Best Director:  Charlie Scott for Medea
  Houston Press:  Best Production:  Medea

2006
  Houston Press:  Best Original Show:  Speeding Motorcycle

References 

Theatre companies in Houston
Culture of Houston